California State Prison, Corcoran (COR) is a male-only state prison located in the city of Corcoran, in Kings County, California. It is also known as Corcoran State Prison,  CSP-C, CSP-COR, CSP-Corcoran, and Corcoran I. The facility is just north of the newer California Substance Abuse Treatment Facility and State Prison, Corcoran (Corcoran II).

Facilities
As of Fiscal Year 2002/2003, COR had a total of 1,703 staff and an annual institutional budget of US$115 million. As of April 30, 2020, COR was incarcerating people at 119.4% of its design capacity, with 3,719 occupants. 
 Individual cells, fenced perimeters and armed coverage
 Level IV housing: Cells, fenced or walled perimeters, electronic security, more staff and armed officers both inside and outside the installation
 Security Housing Units, "the most secure area[s] within a Level IV prison designed to provide maximum coverage".
 The Protective Housing Unit & Death Row  which holds up to 47 prisoners who require "extraordinary protection from other prisoners". The unit houses inmates whose safety would be endangered by general population housing. The Protective Housing Unit has been described as "strikingly calm" because inmates "don't want to be moved somewhere less guarded". One violent incident occurred in March 1999 when three inmates attacked inmate Juan Corona, inflicting minor injuries, and smashed Charles Manson's guitar. Three other Protective Housing Unit inmates suffered minor injuries.
 Acute care hospital
 Prison Industry Authority

History
Built on what was once Tulare Lake, home to the Yokuts Native American people, the facility opened in 1988. The prison hospital was dedicated in October 1993.

In March 1993, at Corcoran, prisoner Wayne Jerome Robertson raped Eddie Dillard, a prisoner about half his size, after the latter was reassigned to his cell. Robertson, who had the nickname "Booty Bandit", testified in 1999 that prison guards set up the attack. Dillard testified in the same trial. After Robertson was assigned to general population at Pelican Bay State Prison, California state senator Tom Hayden stated "It is almost certain that he would be targeted for death."

A front-page article by Mark Arax in the August 1996 Los Angeles Times claimed that COR was "the most troubled of the 32 state prisons". At the time, COR officers had shot and killed more inmates "than any prison in the country" in COR's eight years of existence.  Seven inmates had been killed, and 50 others seriously wounded.  Based on interviews and documents, Arax concluded that many shootings of prisoners were "not justified" and that in some cases "the wrong inmate was killed by mistake". Furthermore, the article alleged that "officers ... and their supervisors staged fights between inmates" during "gladiator days". In November 1996, CBS Evening News broadcast "video footage of an inmate fatally shot by guards" at COR in 1994; this death "spawned a probe by the Federal Bureau of Investigation of alleged inmate abuses by guards".

A March 1997 episode of the CBS News 60 Minutes discussed the 1994 death, "the alleged cover-up and the alarming number of shootings at the prison". The California Department of Corrections issued the results of its own investigation in November 1997, which found "isolated incidents of staff misconduct" but no "widespread staff conspiracy' to abuse prisoners".

A film titled Maximum Security University, which used prison surveillance tapes showing four 1989–1993 fights "end[ing] when a guard fatally shoots a combatant", was released in February 1998. That month, eight California correctional officers and supervisors were indicted "on federal criminal civil rights charges in connection with inmate fights that occurred at Corcoran State Prison in 1994". After a trial, the eight men were "acquitted of all charges" in June 2000.

As of 1999 California had paid out several large prison brutality settlements for incidents at Corcoran, including $2.2 million to inmate Vincent Tulumis paralyzed for life in a May 1993 shooting, and $825,000 for the killing of Preston Tate in April 1994.

Subsequently, COR has been featured in at least two episodes of MSNBC's Lockup series: "Inside Corcoran" (first aired as early as 2003) and "Return to Corcoran" (first aired in 2005).

In July 2013, many inmates at COR participated in a state-wide hunger strike protesting the use of solitary confinement. Billy Michael Sell, an inmate in COR who had been participating in the hunger strike, committed suicide by hanging himself while in a Security Housing Unit (SHU). He had been protesting from July 8 to July 21.  Sell's death caused significant controversy, as inmate advocates reported that fellow prisoners had heard Sell asking for medical attention for several days before his eventual suicide. His suicide triggered reviews of the circumstances behind his death at the local, state, and federal level; with Amnesty International calling for an independent inquiry into his death, one without ties to the government.

Notable inmates (current and former)

Current
 Isauro Aguirre — convicted and sentenced to death for torturing and killing Gabriel Fernandez. He is currently on death row awaiting execution.  
 Joseph James DeAngelo — serial killer and rapist who received multiple sentences of life without parole in 2020 for 13 murders committed between 1975 and 1986. In protective custody.
 Scott Dyleski — sentenced to 25 years to life for a murder committed at age 16.
 Dana Ewell — a convicted triple murderer, he ordered the murders of his family in 1992. Serving three life sentences and has exhausted his appeals. In protective custody.
Phillip Garrido — who kidnapped Jaycee Dugard in 1991. He is serving 431 years to life.
 Binh Thai Luc — serving five life sentences for murdering his friend Vincent Lei and four of Lei's family members.
 Mikhail Markhasev — convicted murderer of Ennis Cosby, son of entertainer Bill Cosby.  In 1998, he received a sentence of life without parole, plus 10 years.
 Brandon Pettit — convicted of murdering his parents and sentenced to two consecutive terms of life imprisonment without parole.
 John Floyd Thomas, Jr. — serial rapist and killer
 David Turpin — sentenced to 25 years to life for holding captive and torturing 12 of his 13 children.
 Michael Jace — serving 40 years to life for the 2014 murder of his wife.

Former
 Rodney Alcala — the "dating game killer." He was sentenced to death in 1980, 1986, and 2010. On July 24, 2021, Alcala died from natural causes at a hospital.
 Juan Corona — murdered twenty-five people in 1971. He was transferred to COR from the Correctional Training Facility in 1992. On March 4, 2019, Corona died from natural causes.
John Albert Gardner III — convicted of the murders of Chelsea King (2010) and Amber Dubois (2009).
 Charles Manson — leader of the Manson family. Manson was transferred from San Quentin State Prison to COR in March 1989.  On November 12, 2017, Manson was taken to a Bakersfield hospital for an unspecified illness. On November 19, 2017, Manson died at the hospital.
 Joe "Pegleg" Morgan — infamous member of the Mexican Mafia.  He was at Pelican Bay State Prison prior to being hospitalized at COR from October 1993 until his death in November 1993.
 Yenok Ordoyan — Armenian surgeon who was convicted of welfare fraud. He earned the moniker the "King of Welfare", and was released February 21, 2000.
 Sirhan Sirhan — convicted assassin of United States Senator Robert F. Kennedy. He was transferred to COR from the Correctional Training Facility in 1992 and lived in COR's Protective Housing Unit until he was moved to a harsher lockdown at COR in 2003. He was denied parole in March 2006, also in March 2011.  He was moved to Pleasant Valley State Prison in Coalinga as of October 29, 2009.  He was subsequently moved back to COR and on November 22, 2013 he was transferred to the Richard J. Donovan Correctional Facility in San Diego County.
 Joseph Son — South Korean mixed martial arts fighter, manager, and actor. He served 7 years to life for rape and torture until he killed a convicted sex offender, Michael Thomas Graham. He was transferred to Salinas Valley State Prison in October 2014.

See also 

 List of California state prisons

References

External links
 Corcoran State Prison official CDCR webpage
 Corcoran State Prison at the Center for Land Use Interpretation
 California Department of Corrections and Rehabilitation Official website

Prisons in California
Corcoran, California
Buildings and structures in Kings County, California
Government buildings completed in 1989
1989 establishments in California